Flatmania is a French-Canadian animated television series, which is based on a visual style created by Anne-Caroline Pandolfo and Isabelle Simler and produced by Method Animation, Futurikon and Vivatoon with the participation of Disney Televisions France, YTV, SRC, and France 3,  The series is about a teenager named Vincent who gets transported into the Flatmania (a series of magazines) paper world. During each adventure, Vincent and Kyu arrive on a latest magazine and must find a rift that will send them to the next magazine.

Characters
Vincent (voiced by Logan Henderson) - The lead character.
Kyu (voiced by Chance Sabouri) - A cute friend.

Art style
The characters in Flatmania are animated as two-dimensionally flat, so when they turn around or are seen from the side, will appear to be paper. The style was re-used in another Futurikon series, Pop Secret.

Television airing
The series is first premiered on France 3 in France. Internationally, the series is aired on Animania TV in the United States, YTV and SRC in Canada, ABC Kids in Australia, Pop in the UK, Rai Gulp in Italy, Nickelodeon in Germany, ZigZap in Poland and Happy TV in Serbia.

External links
 Official site
 French Site
 ABC Flatmania Page
 IMDb page

2000s French animated television series
2004 French television series debuts
2008 French television series endings
French children's animated adventure television series
Television series by Method Animation